Bryantella is a genus of jumping spiders that was first described by Arthur Merton Chickering in 1946.  it contains only two species, found only in Brazil, Argentina, and Panama: B. smaragda and B. speciosa. This genus was named in honour of Elizabeth B. Bryant.

References

Salticidae
Salticidae genera
Spiders of South America